This is a list of American made-for-television films and television specials which reunited the original cast members of a defunct prime time network television series.

Television reunion films
The following is a list of films reuniting the cast of a television series, reprising their original characters in a story set in that film's present day.

Television reunion specials
The following is a list of specials celebrating a classic television series (retrospective, cast reunion, reminiscence, behind-the-scenes, interview/clip show).

References
TV series reunion films and specials at IMDb
Encyclopedia of Film Themes, Settings and Series Armstrong, Richard B. and Armstrong, Mary Willems.

Films based on television series
Television series reunion films
Television series reunion specials